Thomas Zacharia (born 1957 in Kerala, India) is an Indian-born American computer scientist. He received his bachelor's degree in mechanical engineering from National Institute of Technology, Karnataka in 1980 and a master's degree in Materials Science from the University of Mississippi in 1984. He obtained his doctoral degree from Clarkson University in 1987.

He has contributed to research in computational materials science, particularly on Marangoni Effect in solidification processes. He previously served as the executive vice president and chief port officer captain at Qatar Science & Technology Park at Qatar Foundation.

Zacharia was previously deputy director for science and technology at Oak Ridge National Laboratory and a professor at the University of Tennessee.

On June 1, 2017, UT-Battelle named Zacharia as ORNL's new laboratory director. He succeeds Thom Mason.

References

1957 births
Indian emigrants to the United States
Living people
American people of Malayali descent
Scientists from Kerala
Georgia Tech faculty
Oak Ridge National Laboratory people
University of Tennessee faculty
National Institute of Technology, Karnataka alumni
Qatar Foundation people